Yamaoka is a Japanese surname. Notable people with the surname include:

  (born 1968), Japanese video game composer (Silent Hill series)
 Kristi Yamaoka (born 1987), American cheerleader discussed in Cheerleading#Dangers of cheerleading
  (born 1943), Japanese politician of the Democratic Party of Japan
 , Japanese professional baseball player
  (1526–1585), samurai
  (1836–1888), samurai

Fictional characters:
 Shirō Yamaoka, protagonist of the manga series Oishinbo
 Rin Yamaoka, a playable character in the video game Dead by Daylight
 Kazan Yamaoka, a playable character in the video game Dead by Daylight

See also
 Yamaoka Station, train station in Ena, Gifu Prefecture, Japan
 Yamaoka, Gifu, former town in Ena, Gifu Prefecture, Japan

Japanese-language surnames